Black Horse Tavern-Bellvue Hotel and Office is a historic inn and tavern complex located at Hollins, Roanoke County, Virginia. The complex consists of the Black Horse Tavern (c. 1782), the Greek Revival style Bellvue Hotel (also known as Kyle's Hotel) (c. 1854) and the temple-fronted, Greek Revival style brick Office (c. 1840). Other contributing resources on the property include a spring house (c. 1900) and a shed (c. 1930).  The Black Horse Tavern is a simple, one story, three-bay log structure.  The Bellvue Hotel is a two-story, five-bay, brick structure with a central-passage, double-pile plan.  The office is a simple, one-story, one-bay brick structure.  It features a wide frieze band and a front portico with a pedimented gable supported by squared Doric order columns.  The buildings housed a school for physically and mentally handicapped children and the property became known as Bellevue School during the mid-20Ih century.  The school closed in 1976, and the buildings house a single family residence.

It was added to the National Register of Historic Places in 2003.

References

Drinking establishments on the National Register of Historic Places in Virginia
Hotel buildings on the National Register of Historic Places in Virginia
Greek Revival architecture in Virginia
Hotel buildings completed in 1782
Buildings and structures in Roanoke County, Virginia
National Register of Historic Places in Roanoke County, Virginia
1782 establishments in Virginia
American companies established in 1782